Al Nasraniya is a village in Qatar, located in the municipality of Al-Shahaniya. It was demarcated in 1988. It used to be part of the Al Jemailiya municipality before the municipality was incorporated into Al Rayyan. In 2014, the settlement was incorporated into the newly-created Al-Shahaniya Municipality.

Etymology
Nasraniya was named after a local well. Because the well was built on rocky, solid ground, locals had to dig deep under the surface for the well to function. Once the well was working, it was a described as a victory, and the locals decided to name the well Nasraniya, meaning Christianity, in allusion to the victory of Islam in superseding Christianity as the predominant religion in the Arabian Peninsula.

History
J.G. Lorimer mentioned Nasraniya in 1908 in his Gazetteer of the Persian Gulf, stating that it lies "11 miles south of the foot of Dohat Faishsākh and 16 miles west from the coast" and remarked on the presence of a masonry well, 25 fathoms (150 feet) deep, yielding good water.

Infrastructure
After Qatar started to receive substantial profits from its oil extraction activities in the 1960s and 1970s, it launched many housing projects for its citizens. As part of this initiative, 40 houses were built in Al Nasraniya by 1976.

Two government buildings are based in Al Nasraniya. They belong to The Ministry of Municipality and Environment, which has an office in the village. There are no health care facilities.

Gallery

References

Populated places in Al-Shahaniya